Jennifer Eigenbrode is an interdisciplinary astrobiologist who works at NASA's Goddard Space Flight Center. She specializes in organic chemistry, geology, and organic bio-geochemistry of martian and ocean-world environments.

Early life and education 
Eigenbrode's family of engineers and technicians helped foster her enjoyment of science and her naturally inquisitive nature. Geology grabbed her curiosity from an early age and she became a "professional geology student".

Eigenbrode obtained her B.S. in geology from James Madison University in Virginia. Her senior thesis explored the clay mineralogy of river terrace soils in Virginia. Her master's degree was obtained from Indiana University and focused on geological sciences. Her Ph.D. was obtained at Pennsylvania State University where her dissertation topic was "Late Archean microbial ecology: an integration of molecular isotopic, and lithologic records". Following her Ph.D., Eigenbrode was a postdoctoral felllow at the Carnegie Institution of Washington from 2004 until 2007. In 2007 she accepted a position at the National Aeronautic and Space Administration as a space scientist.

Research 
Eigenbrode's early research was on the Earth's atmosphere during the Archean era where she examined organic carbon, sulfur, and the origin of aerobic ecosystems. She then moved on to examining organic compounds found in Neoarchaean rocks, establishing field methods to prepare samples for analysis, and developing methods to preserve samples from Mars in a manner that allows investigation of biosignatures.

Her current research focuses on Mars, and uses samples collected by the rover Curiosity which she uses to search for signals of life on Mars. She received NASA's Internal Research and Development (IRAD) Innovator of the Year award in 2009 for her work on a sample preparation module needed to collect samples from Mars. She is a part of the team working on samples from Mars including gases and soils, and radiation on the planet. She was lead author on a paper examining organic matter within the samples from Mars, research that used the SAM instrument (Sample Analysis at Mars) to burn samples collected from the surface of Mars and examined the resulting gas to determine the composition of the samples. Eigenbrode is also establishing the groundwork to use the CheMin (Chemistry and Mineralogy) instrument on Curiosity to detect organic salts in the Mars samples.

Selected publications

Awards and honors 
Philips Cosminski Award, James Madison University, 1994
Geological Society of America Outstanding Student Research Award, 1997
NASA Goddard Innovator of the Year Award, 2009
Goddard Space Flight Center Honor Award - New Opportunities Captured Team, award to the Enceladus Life Signature and Habitability (ELSAH) Mission Team, 2018
Goddard Space Flight Center Honor Award for Science, 2018
Pennsylvania State University 125th Anniversary fellow of the College of Earth and Mineral Sciences

References

External links 

 November 13, 2020 interview

Indiana University alumni
Pennsylvania State University alumni
Living people
NASA people
Women space scientists
American women chemists
Year of birth missing (living people)
James Madison University alumni
Space scientists
21st-century American chemists
21st-century American women scientists